Baneh County is in Kurdistan province, Iran. The capital of the county is the city of Baneh. At the 2006 census, the county's population was 116,773 in 24,709 households. The following census in 2011 counted 132,565 people in 32,669 households. At the 2016 census, the county's population was 158,690 in 43,772 households.

Administrative divisions

The population history of Baneh County's administrative divisions over three consecutive censuses is shown in the following table. The latest census shows four districts, eight rural districts, and four cities.

References

 

Counties of Kurdistan Province